Wesley Nelson (born 18 March 1998) is an English singer and television personality. In 2018, he appeared in the fourth series of the ITV2 reality series Love Island, and has since competed on Dancing on Ice, The X Factor: Celebrity, Celebrity SAS: Who Dares Wins and won The Games.
Ex arsenal academy until bad knee injury

Career
In 2018, Nelson became a contestant on the fourth series of the ITV2 dating reality series Love Island. He, alongside reality star Megan Barton-Hanson, reached the final and finished in fourth place. In January 2019, Nelson participated in the eleventh series of Dancing on Ice. He was partnered with Vanessa Bauer, and finished as runner-up. In October 2019, he competed in The X Factor: Celebrity as part of a group called No Love Lost, composed of former Love Island stars Samira Mighty, Zara McDermott and Eyal Booker.

In August 2020, Nelson announced that he had signed a solo record deal with EMI Records. On 17 September 2020, he released his debut single, "See Nobody" with Hardy Caprio. On 1 April 2021, he released the single, "Nice to Meet Ya" featuring Yxng Bane.

Filmography

Discography

Singles

As lead artist

As featured artist

See also
 List of Dancing on Ice contestants
 List of Love Island (2015 TV series) contestants

References

External links 
 

1998 births
21st-century British male singers
British people of Barbadian descent
EMI Records artists
English male rappers
English television personalities
Living people
Musicians from Staffordshire
The X Factor (British TV series) contestants
Love Island (2015 TV series) contestants